Porijõgi is a river in Põlva and Tartu County, Estonia. The river is 50.2 km long and basin size is 298 km2. It runs into Emajõgi.

Trout and grayling live also in the river.

References

Rivers of Estonia
Põlva County
Tartu County